Norrell is a surname. Notable people with the surname include:

 Catherine Dorris Norrell (1901–1981), American politician
 Clif Norrell, record producer
 Mandy Powers Norrell (born 1973), American politician
 William F. Norrell (1896–1961), American politician

See also
 Jonathan Strange & Mr Norrell
 Norell